Tomorrow Morning is a 2006 Serbian drama film directed by Oleg Novković.
It was Serbia's submission to the 79th Academy Awards for the Academy Award for Best Foreign Language Film, but was not accepted as a nominee.

Cast 
 Uliks Fehmiu - Nele
 Nada Šargin - Sale
 Nebojša Glogovac - Mare
 Lazar Ristovski - Zdravko
 Ljubomir Bandović - Bure
  - Ceca
  - Zora
  - Maja
  - Sima
 Jelena Đokić - Radnica u pekari
 Branko Cvejić - Cika Sava
 Renata Ulmanski - Komsinica
 Nebojša Ilić - Taksista

References

External links 

2006 drama films
2006 films
2000s Serbian-language films
Films set in Serbia
Films shot in Serbia
Serbian drama films